Dylan Defang Asonganyi (born 10 December 2000) is an English professional footballer who plays as a forward for Cambridge City.

Club career

Milton Keynes Dons
Asonganyi joined Milton Keynes Dons' academy at a young age, progressing through various age groups and into the club's development squad. Following a productive start to the 2017–18 season with the club's under-18 team, in which he scored 9 goals in 7 appearances, Asonganyi was reportedly gaining interest from Premier League clubs including Arsenal, Liverpool and Manchester United. As a 16-year-old, he was named as a substitute for the first team in a 0–0 EFL Trophy group stage fixture against Stevenage on 3 October 2017.

On 30 December 2017, Asonganyi signed professional terms with the club, signing a two-and-a-half-year deal. After missing the latter half of the 2017–18 season through injury, Asonganyi made his professional debut on 11 August 2018, being named in the starting lineup in a 1–0 home league victory over Bury. Three days later, Asonganyi scored his first professional goal for the club in a 3–0 EFL Cup first round home win over Charlton Athletic. Asonganyi joined Maidenhead United on loan on 13 March 2020. He played a single game before his loan was cut short due to the COVID-19 pandemic. Following the conclusion of the 2019–20 season, Asonganyi was one of nine players released by Milton Keynes Dons.

Oxford United 
On 18 August 2020, Asonganyi joined League One club Oxford United following a successful trial. On 3 December 2020, Asonganyi joined National League South club Chelmsford City on a one-month loan. On 3 February 2021, the loan was extended to the end of the 2020–21 season. He was released by Oxford at the end of the 2020–21 season.

Non-league
Asonganyi joined Maidenhead for the 2021–22 season. He joined Kings Langley on loan in February 2022. He left the Magpies at the end of the 2021-22 season after eight appearances.

In August 2022 he joined Cambridge City.

Club statistics

References

2000 births
Living people
English footballers
Association football forwards
Milton Keynes Dons F.C. players
Maidenhead United F.C. players
Oxford United F.C. players
Chelmsford City F.C. players
Kings Langley F.C. players
Cambridge City F.C. players
English Football League players
Southern Football League players
National League (English football) players
Northern Premier League players
Black British sportspeople